The People's Liberation Army Air Force Early Warning Academy (AFEWA), also referred to as the Wuhan Radar Institute is a professional military education institution of the Chinese People's Liberation Army Air Force (PLAAF).

The institute operates four campuses, but is headquartered in Wuhan, Hubei Province.

History 
Today's Air Force Early Warning Academy began as two separate institutions, a military communications school and an air defense school. Their later merger in 1958 would form the Air Force Radar Academy until it was renamed to its present title.

Communications school 
In 1950, following communist victory in the Chinese Civil War and establishment of the People's Republic of China, the newly formed People's Liberation Army established the East China Military Region Communications School in Nanjing. On 15 September 1951, the Central Military Commission (CMC) renamed the school to the Third Communication School of the People's Liberation Army. On 29 October 1952, the school was renamed to the Radar School, a name it maintained for another three years until, in 1955, it was retitled the People's Liberation Army Air Defense Radar School and transferred from the Communications Department of the General Staff to the Air Defense Force. In 1957, the school was once again renamed to the Chinese People's Liberation Army Air Force Radar Technical College and placed under the command of the PLAAF Headquarters.

Air defense school 
In June of 1952, separate from the communications school, the PLA established its Air Defense School in Nanchang, Jiangxi. In November 1952, the school was moved to the AFEWA's present location in Wuhan City, Hubei Province and was subordinated to the Air Defense Command of the CMC. In September 1955, the school was renamed to the Air Defense School under the Air Defense Force. Two years later, in August 1957, the school was once again renamed to the Air Force Air Defense School of the Chinese People's Liberation Army and transferred to the Air Force.

Merge 
In September 1958, the then Air Force Radar Technical College merged with the Air Force Air Defense School to form the AFEWA's primary predecessor, the Chinese People's Liberation Army Air Force Radar School, managed by the Wuhan Military Region Air Force. Eleven years alter, in November 1969, the school was briefly renamed to the Air Force Fourth College but its name was reversed in May of 1975 and in July 1983 became the Air Force Radar Academy under the Guangzhou Military Region Air Force. The academy would remain until August 1992 when it was transferred from the Guangzhou Military Region Air Force to report directly to PLAAF headquarters. In 1996, the Air Force Radar Academy established its Huangpi campus. In 2004, the Suizhou Non-Commissioned Officer Brigade was established under the Air Force Radar Academy and campuses were established in Suizhou and Yichang. In July 2011, the Academy was renamed to its present title, the Air Force Early Warning Academy of the People's Liberation Army.

Education 
The Air Force Early Warning Academy, accredited under both the Chinese Ministry of Education and the Central Military Commission (CMC), recruits male high school graduates across the People's Republic of China (PRC) and provides graduates a bachelor's degree in either military science or engineering and the requisite training to fill platoon and company leadership positions as junior officers in early warning and detection units. In 2017, the academy recruited 340 young men from 21 provinces (including directly-administered municipalities and autonomous regions).

The AFEWA offers five majors to enrolled students:

 Early warning and detection, 77.6% of enrollees
 Radar engineering, 10.3% of enrollees
 Command information systems engineering, 3.2% of enrollees
 Network power command and engineering, 2.9% of enrollees
 Unmanned systems engineering, 5.9% of enrollees

In all but the unmanned systems engineering major, students reapply to the program for their master's degree. For the radar engineering and network power command and engineering majors, graduates must serve for two years before reapplying while graduates of the early warning and detection and command information systems engineering programs may apply for a masters directly following their completion of the bachelor's program.

The AFEWA also publishes the academic Journal of Air Force Early Warning Academy which covers topics such as developing theories, technologies, and processes in radar and related communications technologies. Established in 1987, the journal became a quarterly publication in 1999, and bimonthly in 2009. Originally named the Journal of Air Force Radar Academy, it was renamed to its present name in 2013. As of 7 June 2020, the journal had published 2,249 papers which had been cited 6,085 times and downloaded 62,355 times.

Campuses 
The AFEWA operates four campuses

 Headquarters campus at 288 Hangpu Street, Jian'an District, Wuhan City, Hubei Province
 Huangpi Campus (Huangpi Non-Commissioned Officer School) at 3 Qiangjun Road, Wuhu Street, Huangpi District, Wuhan City, Hubei Province
 Yichang Campus (Yichang Training Brigade) in Longquan Township, Yiling District, Yichang City, Hubei Province
 Suizhou Campus (Suizhou Branch) in Suizhou City, Hubei Province

Notable members

Wang Yongliang 
Major General Wang Yongliang is professor and doctoral supervisor at the Air Force Early Warning Academy is a renowned radar technologist. Born in June 1965 in Jiaxing, Zhejiang, in 1987 Wang graduated from the AFEWA's predecessor, the Air Force Radar Academy, and is an academician of the Chinese Academy of Sciences. Wang is well-known for his theories and breakthrough achievements in time-based signal processing in radar and his accomplishments have found wide application in the PLAAF such as in the branch's anti-clutter, anti-jamming, and moving target detection radar capabilities aboard reconnaissance, fighter, and early-warning platforms.

Xiong Jiajun 
Major General Xiong Jiajun is a professor and doctoral supervisor at the Air Force Early Warning Academy and is one of the PLAAF's preeminent technical experts in the fields of early warning and intelligence. From Tianmen, Hubei, Xiong previously served as a representative of the 12th National People's Congress (NPC) and presently serves as director of the Chinese Command and Control Society and Chinese Military Operations Research Society. Xiong is also serves as an expert member of the China Cloud Computing Expert Advisory Committee and the Air Force Information Technology Expert Advisory Committee, and a judge on both the Military Weapons and Equipment Science and Technology Award Review Committee and Air Force Senior Professional Technical Title Evaluation Committee.

References 

Air force academies
Military education and training in China
People's Liberation Army Air Force
Universities and colleges in Wuhan
Educational institutions established in 1958
1958 establishments in China